Haviq (also Romanized as Ḩavīq; also known as Hevik) is a city and capital of Haviq District, in Talesh County, Gilan Province, Iran.  At the 2006 census, it's population was 1,237, in 289 families.

Language 
Linguistic composition of the city.

References

Populated places in Talesh County

Cities in Gilan Province

Azerbaijani settlements in Gilan Province